Krševan Santini (born 11 April 1987) is a Croatian footballer who plays as a goalkeeper. He currently plays for Lokomotiva Zagreb.

Career
Krševan Santini, born in Zadar, followed in the footsteps of his younger brother Ivan, who would also become a professional football player, and joined the NK Zadar youth team after watching his brother play. He debuted aged 17, coming in the 4–1 loss against NK Inter Zaprešić on 20.11.2004, for Thomas Amugi, after Danijel Subašić was sent off and conceding three goals in the last 15 minutes of the game. He didn't appear again for the club, and as Antonijo Ježina was chosen as Subašić's replacement, he decided to move elsewhere in late 2005. After trying to find a club in Italy and not succeeding, he joined the third-tier NK Velebit for the remainder of the season. He moved on to the Druga HNL. He spent the following four seasons alternating between Druga HNL and Treća HNL, playing for HNK Segesta, HNŠK Moslavina, NK Velebit again and NK Hrvatski Dragovoljac.

In the summer of 2010 he found his first professional engagement, signing a contract with the very club he made his Prva HNL debut against in 2004, NK Inter Zaprešić, as a replacement for Matej Delač. He went on to become a first team fixture, playing 76 league games for the club in the following two and a half years.

Santini made his first move abroad in February 2013, more precisely, Ukraine, signing a contract with FC Zorya Luhansk, which was extended to two years in May 2013 after his good performances for the team.

On 23 June 2016, Santin signed with Neftchi Baku, before having his contract terminated by mutual consent on 16 December 2016.

In June 2017, Santini returned to Inter Zaprešić.

International career
Santini was on the list for the Croatia U21 friendlies against the Faroe Islands U21 team in 2007, while playing in the Druga HNL for HNŠK Moslavina.

Personal life
His brother is striker Ivan Santini, who has been capped for Croatia senior team. Their father is the late singer Romeo Santini.

References

External links
 

1987 births
Living people
Sportspeople from Zadar
Croatian people of Italian descent
Association football goalkeepers
Croatian footballers
NK Zadar players
NK Moslavina players
NK Hrvatski Dragovoljac players
NK Inter Zaprešić players
FC Zorya Luhansk players
Enosis Neon Paralimni FC players
Neftçi PFK players
NK Osijek players
NK Domžale players
Jagiellonia Białystok players
NK Lokomotiva Zagreb players
Croatian Football League players
Ukrainian Premier League players
Cypriot First Division players
Azerbaijan Premier League players
Slovenian PrvaLiga players
Croatian expatriate footballers
Expatriate footballers in Ukraine
Expatriate footballers in Cyprus
Expatriate footballers in Azerbaijan
Expatriate footballers in Poland
Expatriate footballers in Slovenia
Croatian expatriate sportspeople in Ukraine
Croatian expatriate sportspeople in Cyprus
Croatian expatriate sportspeople in Azerbaijan
Croatian expatriate sportspeople in Poland
Croatian expatriate sportspeople in Slovenia